Manchester Haynes Wheeler (March 2, 1939 – August 11, 2018) was an American football quarterback. He played college football at the University of Maine, serving as a versatile utility player who kicked and played defense in addition to quarterbacking in a brief revival of the one-platoon system era. He played four games in the American Football League with the Buffalo Bills, serving as backup to Jack Kemp, before the team signed Daryle Lamonica the following season. He spent much of the next several years as a quarterback in the minor leagues. His most successful season was in 1968, when, mostly acting as a game manager in a run-heavy offense that included Marv Hubbard and Mel Meeks, he led the Hartford Knights to a 15-1 season before being unceremoniously benched in the Atlantic Coast Football League championship in favor of rookie Dick Faucette. Following that season, he left to join his final team, the Continental Football League's Portland Loggers.

See also 
 Other American Football League players

References 

1939 births
2018 deaths
Sportspeople from Augusta, Maine
American football quarterbacks
Maine Black Bears football players
Buffalo Bills players
Players of American football from Maine
American Football League players